Sudovia can refer to:

In geography
 Sudovia/Yotvingia, ancient Baltic land inhabited by Sudovians/Yotvingians
 Suvalkija, one of the five cultural regions of Lithuania
 Suwałki Region, region in Poland near the border with Lithuania

In sport
 Sūduva stadium, multi-use stadium in Marijampolė, Lithuania
 FK Sūduva Marijampolė, a football club from the city of Marijampolė, Lithuania
 BC Arvi-Sūduva, a basketball club of Marijampolė, Lithuania